Museum of the Risorgimento (Italian - Museo del Risorgimento) may refer to:

Museum of the Risorgimento (Castelfidardo)
Museum of the Risorgimento (Milan)
Museum of the Risorgimento (Padua)
Museum of the Risorgimento (Rome)
Museum of the Risorgimento (Turin)